Pietro Carattoli (1703 in Perugia – after 1762) was an Italian painter of quadratura. He also made some smale scale architectural designs, such as the portal of the Cathedral of Perugia.

He was active in Perugia, where he painted for the chapel of sacrament in church of San Pietro, for the Palazzo Donini, and Palazzo Antinori

References

1703 births
1762 deaths
18th-century Italian painters
Italian male painters
Umbrian painters
Quadratura painters
18th-century Italian male artists